Josip Pirmajer (14 February 1944 – 24 June 2018) was a Slovenian football player and manager who played as a winger. At international level, he represented the Yugoslavia national team.

Playing career

Club
Pirmajer was born in Trbovlje in present-day Slovenia. At the time of his birth, Trbovlje was renamed Trifail by the occupying Nazi German forces. He moved with his family to Serbia to Srbobran in 1947. His football skills were spotted while he was in elementary school and he joined the youth-team of Elan Srbobran. When he was 16, with a special medical permission, he was allowed to start playing in the main team of Elan Srbobran.  After a handful of games he attracted attention from bigger clubs, and shortly after he joined RFK Novi Sad. He debuted in the season 1960–61 in which Novi Sad made their historical promotion to the Yugoslav First League after winning the 1960–61 Yugoslav Second League East. Pirmajer played the following two and a half seasons with Novi Sad in the First League, until the winter-break of the 1963–64 season when he was brought by FK Partizan. Pirmajer moved to the capital and played with Partizan a total of four and a half seasons during which he won one championship and was European vice-champion after losing the 1966 European Cup Final. During his spell in Partizan he got the record of having played 252 consecutive competitive matches.

In summer 1967 Pirmajer returned to Novi Sad this time joining FK Vojvodina where he played further four seasons in Yugoslav top-flight. Afterwards, he played two and half seasons abroad, in France, with Nîmes Olympique in League 1. During the 1974–75 winter break, Pirmajer returned to Yugoslavia and, aged 30, he joined his former club RFK Novi Sad playing with them until summer 1977 in the Yugoslav Second League.

International
Pirmajer played for all youth levels of the Yugoslav national team, including the Olympic team, before debuting for Yugoslav national team in 1964. He made four appearances for Yugoslavia.

Managerial career
After retiring, Pirmajer became a coach and he worked at RFK Novi Sad, FK Jedinstvo Novi Bečej, FK Vojvodina, FK Elan Srbobran, FK Beograd, FK Sileks, FK Big Bull Bačinci and FK Bečej.

Pirmajer continued living in Serbia where he became president of FK Srbobran.

In January 2009, the Sports Association of the municipality of Srbobran gave Pirmajer a special award as recognition of him as the most successful sportsman from Srboobran and for his overall contribution for development of sport in the municipality. As well as being an excellent footballer, Pirmajer played also handball with RK Bačka, basketball with KK Akademik, and table tennis.

Death
Pirmajer died on 24 June 2018 in Srbobran, Serbia at the age of 74.

Honours
Novi Sad
Yugoslav Second League

Partizan
Yugoslav First League: 1964–65
European Cup: 1965–66 finalist

Notes

References

1944 births
2018 deaths
People from Trbovlje
People from Srbobran
Serbian people of Slovenian descent
Association football forwards
Slovenian footballers
Serbian footballers
Yugoslav footballers
Yugoslavia international footballers
Mediterranean Games gold medalists for Yugoslavia
Competitors at the 1971 Mediterranean Games
Mediterranean Games medalists in football
Olympic footballers of Yugoslavia
Footballers at the 1964 Summer Olympics
RFK Novi Sad 1921 players
FK Partizan players
FK Vojvodina players
Nîmes Olympique players
Yugoslav First League players
Ligue 1 players
Slovenian football managers
Serbian football managers
FK Vojvodina managers
FK Sileks managers
Slovenian expatriate football managers
Expatriate football managers in North Macedonia
Slovenian expatriate sportspeople in North Macedonia